Turrella is a genus of sea snails, marine gastropod mollusks in the family Clathurellidae.

Species
Species within the genus Turrella include:
 Turrella asperrima Laseron, 1954
 Turrella crassa Laseron, 1954
 Turrella gracilis Laseron, 1954
 Turrella granulosissima (Tenison-Woods, 1879)
 Turrella letourneuxiana (Crosse & P. Fischer, 1865)
 Turrella morologus (Hedley, 1922)
 Turrella subcostata Laseron, 1954
 Turrella tenuilirata (Angas, 1871)

References

 Laseron, C. F. (1954). Revision of the New South Wales Turridae. Royal Zoological Society of New South Wales Australian Zoological Handbook. Sydney: Royal Zoological Society of New South Wales. 56 pp., 12 pls.

External links
  Bouchet, P.; Kantor, Y. I.; Sysoev, A.; Puillandre, N. (2011). A new operational classification of the Conoidea (Gastropoda). Journal of Molluscan Studies. 77(3): 273-308

 
Gastropod genera